1212 Francette, provisional designation , is a dark Hildian asteroid from the outermost regions of the asteroid belt, approximately 82 kilometers in diameter. It was discovered on 3 December 1931, by French astronomer Louis Boyer at the Algiers Observatory in Algeria, North Africa, who named it after his wife Francette Boyer.

Orbit and classification 

Francette is a member of the small Hilda family, an asteroid family within the dynamical Hilda group, that stays in an orbital resonance with the  gas giant Jupiter. It orbits the Sun in the outermost asteroid belt at a distance of 3.2–4.7 AU once every 7 years and 10 months (2,872 days; semi-major axis of 3.95 AU). Its orbit has an eccentricity of 0.19 and an inclination of 8° with respect to the ecliptic.

The body's observation arc begins at Algiers with its official discovery observation.

Physical characteristics 

In the Tholen classification, Francette is a primitive P-type asteroid. In the SMASS classification it is an X-type asteroid. The Wide-field Infrared Survey Explorer (WISE) also characterizes Francette as a dark P-type, while the overall spectral type for members of the Hilda family is typically that of a carbonaceous C-type.

Rotation period 

In July 2016, a rotational lightcurve of Francette was obtained from photometric observations by American astronomers Brian Warner, Robert Stephens and Dan Coley at the Center for Solar System Studies in California. Lightcurve analysis gave a rotation period of 22.433 hours with a brightness variation of 0.13 magnitude, superseding a period of 16 hours, previously measured in the 1970s.

Diameter and albedo 

According to the surveys carried out by the Infrared Astronomical Satellite IRAS, the Japanese Akari satellite and the NEOWISE mission of NASA's WISE telescope, Francette measures between 76.395 and 85.81 kilometers in diameter and its surface has an albedo between 0.037 and 0.046.

The Collaborative Asteroid Lightcurve Link adopts the results obtained by IRAS, that is, an albedo of 0.0400 and a diameter of 82.13 kilometers based on an absolute magnitude of 9.54.

Naming 

This minor planet was named by the discoverer after his wife, Francette Boyer. The official naming citation was mentioned in The Names of the Minor Planets by Paul Herget in 1955.

Notes

References

External links 
 Asteroid Lightcurve Database (LCDB), query form (info )
 Dictionary of Minor Planet Names, Google books
 Asteroids and comets rotation curves, CdR – Observatoire de Genève, Raoul Behrend
 Discovery Circumstances: Numbered Minor Planets (1)-(5000) – Minor Planet Center
 
 

001212
Discoveries by Louis Boyer (astronomer)
Named minor planets
001212
001212
19311203